Chrysalis Investments (previously known as Merian Chrysalis) is a large British investment trust dedicated to investing in a portfolio of UK and European private companies with long-term growth potential. Established in November 2018, the company is listed on the London Stock Exchange. The chairman is Andrew Haining.

The company was managed by Merian Global Investors until July 2020 when Merian was acquired by Jupiter Fund Management.

References

External links
 

Financial services companies established in 2018
Investment trusts of the United Kingdom
Companies listed on the London Stock Exchange